Bratislava railway station may refer to several stations in Slovakia:

 Bratislava main railway station, on the edge of Old Town
 Bratislava-Petržalka railway station, a terminal station for trains from Austria, located in Petržalka
 Bratislava Lamač railway station, a halt in the Lamač borough of Bratislava
 Bratislava Železná studienka railway station, a halt in the Bratislava Forest Park